Robert Hogg (1877–1963) was an English professional footballer who played as an inside forward.

References

1877 births
1963 deaths
People from Whitburn, Tyne and Wear
Footballers from Tyne and Wear
English footballers
Association football inside forwards
Selbourne F.C. players
Sunderland A.F.C. players
Grimsby Town F.C. players
Blackpool F.C. players
Luton Town F.C. players
English Football League players